Route 11 is a national route of Uruguay. In 1983, it was assigned the name José Batlle y Ordóñez; and in the last stretch it bears the name Ing. Eladio Dieste. It connects Atlántida to Ecilda Paullier.

References

Roads in Uruguay